Czech Republic will be represented by 40 athletes at the 2010 European Athletics Championships held in  Barcelona, Spain, from 27 July to 1 August 2010.

Participants

Men

Track and road events

Field events

Results

References 
 Participants list

Nations at the 2010 European Athletics Championships
2010
European Athletics Championships